Life imprisonment in Israel is legal and the most severe punishment available under Israeli law during peacetime.

Overview
During wartime, the death penalty is applicable for certain crimes in Israel, but has only been used twice, most recently in 1962. Life imprisonment is mandatory in all cases of murder, except in certain circumstances when the sentence is sometimes reduced. Life imprisonment is also used in cases of terrorism, as well as kidnapping and attempted murder. Israeli law also allows life sentences for juveniles under age 18 if convicted of murder. Israel is one of the few countries that allows this.

As a matter of tradition, the President reduces most life sentences to a determinate sentence, usually within the range of 20-30 years, with parole eligibility after two-thirds of that sentence is served. Those convicted of terrorist offenses are not typically granted clemency or parole, and are usually only released in prisoner exchanges.

References
http://www.worldbulletin.net/?aType=haber&ArticleID=91998

Israel
Penal system in Israel